Franciszek Rychnowski (1850 - 1929) was a Polish engineer and an inventor, who also lectured at the Lwów Politechnic. In addition to mundane projects (he was involved with electrification, central heating and the tram system in Lwów, which is now Lviv, Ukraine), he also gained fame for his pseudoscientific theories on eteroid, similar to the concepts of élan vital or orgone; involvement with such pseudoscientific theories eventually ruined his career.

Rychnowski is a minor character in a series of books by the modern Polish author, Andrzej Pilipiuk. He is also one of the central characters in the 2012 fictional conspiracy thriller The Man With the Devil's Hand by Jarek Garliński, and a significant background character in the tabletop game Leviathans.

See also
Jan Szczepanik

Further reading
Andrzej Pilipiuk, Inżynier Rychnowski, PORTAL, 2/99
Bolesław Prus, Zygmunt Szweykowski, Z prac Instytutu Badań Literackich Polskiej Akademii Nauk, Państwowy Instytut Wydawniczy, 1970
Historia kultury materialnej Polski w zarysie: opracowanie zbiorowe, Zakład Narodwoy im. Ossolińskich, 1979

References

External links
Wikimedia Commons: :Image:Rychnbion pic1.JPG; :Image:Rychnmach pic2.JPG
 Krystyna Ryczaj-Marchewczyk Zapomniany wynalazca
 Franciszek Rychnowski i Eteroid 
 Franciszek Rychnowski de Welehrad - odkrywca eteroidu/orgonu 
 

1850 births
1929 deaths
Polish mechanical engineers
Polish inventors
Orgonomy